Maurea is a genus of sea snails, marine gastropod mollusks, in the family Calliostomatidae within the superfamily Trochoidea, the top snails, turban snails and their allies.

Species
Species within the genus Maurea include:
 † Maurea acutangula (Suter, 1917)
 Maurea alertae (B. A. Marshall, 1995)
 Maurea antipodensis (B. A. Marshall, 1995)
 Maurea aupouriana (B. A. Marshall, 1995)
 † Maurea barbara Marwick, 1942
 Maurea benthicola (Dell, 1950)
 Maurea blacki (Powell, 1950)
 Maurea chilena (Rehder, 1971)
 † Maurea correlata C. A. Fleming, 1943
 Maurea delli (McLean & Andrade, 1982)
 Maurea eltanini (Dell, 1990)
 Maurea eminens (B. A. Marshall, 1995)
 † Maurea filifera (Suter, 1917)
 † Maurea finlayi Marwick, 1928
 Maurea foveauxana (Dell, 1950)
 † Maurea fragilis (Finlay, 1923)
 Maurea gibbsorum (B. A. Marshall, 1995)
 † Maurea gracilis (P. Marshall, 1918)
 Maurea granti Powell, 1931
 Maurea jamiesoni (B. A. Marshall, 1995)
 Maurea maui (B. A. Marshall, 1995)
 Maurea megaloprepes Tomlin, 1948
 Maurea muriellae (Vilvens, 2001)
 † Maurea nukumaruensis (Laws, 1930)
 Maurea osbornei (Powell, 1926)
 Maurea pellucida (Valenciennes, 1846)
 Maurea penniketi (B. A. Marshall, 1995)
 Maurea punctulata (Martyn, 1784)
 Maurea regalis (B. A. Marshall, 1995)
 Maurea selecta (Dillwyn, 1817)
 Maurea simulans (B. A. Marshall, 1994)
 Maurea spectabilis (A. Adams, 1855)
 † Maurea suteri (Finlay, 1923)
 Maurea tigris (Gmelin, 1791)
 Maurea turnerarum Powell, 1964
 † Maurea waiareka Laws, 1935
 Maurea waikanae (Oliver, 1926)
 † Maurea waiparaensis (Suter, 1917)

References

Calliostomatidae
Gastropod genera